Robert Roger Porter (born October 25, 1977) is an American lawyer and former political aide who served as White House Staff Secretary for President Donald Trump from January 20, 2017, until February 7, 2018. He was previously Chief of Staff for U.S. Senator Orrin Hatch of Utah.

Porter resigned his position as White House Staff Secretary after domestic abuse allegations from both of his former wives came to public attention.

Early life
Porter grew up in Belmont, Massachusetts, and Washington, D.C. He is the son of Roger B. Porter, a former aide to President George H. W. Bush and currently IBM Professor of Business and Government at Harvard University. Porter's mother Ann Porter, who died in May 2017, was Faculty Dean of Harvard's Dunster House dormitory. After graduating from high school, Porter interned in the U.S. Senate.

Education 
He attended Harvard University, where he studied government and was president of the Harvard Republican Club. After his freshman year at Harvard, he began a two-year stint as a missionary for The Church of Jesus Christ of Latter-day Saints in London. During the summer of his junior year, Porter completed an internship at the White House and worked for the Domestic Policy Council. He graduated in 2002. Porter was a Rhodes Scholar, studying Political Theory at the University of Oxford, where his thesis research focused on C.S. Lewis prior to graduation in 2005. Porter then attended Harvard Law School, graduating in 2008 with his Juris Doctor.

Political career

Porter has worked for Senators Rob Portman and Mike Lee.

In March 2014, Porter began working for Senator Orrin Hatch. Porter was initially appointed Deputy Chief of Staff and was promoted to Chief of Staff in June of that year. Porter left the role in January 2017, to become White House Staff Secretary for President Donald Trump. Porter resigned from the position on February 7, 2018, following public allegations of spousal abuse from his two ex-wives. He was succeeded on an acting basis by Derek Lyons.

Porter and two other former Trump aides criticized Bob Woodward's book Fear: Trump in the White House in September 2018, with Porter defending the president and saying the book was "selective and often misleading" in describing the administration.

The Wall Street Journal published a pro-Trump opinion article by Porter in March 2019, drawing criticism from his second ex-wife who said Porter must address his personal conduct during marriage before returning to public life.

The House Judiciary Committee subpoenaed Porter in August 2019 to testify regarding Trump's actions in response to the Russia investigation,  and the White House directed Porter not to testify in September 2019.

Personal life
In 2003, Porter married Colbie Holderness; they divorced in 2008 and she said he had physically abused her multiple times throughout their marriage. In 2009, he married Jennifer Willoughby. After repeated verbal abuse, she obtained a restraining order against him in 2010. They divorced in 2013.

Porter had been dating former White House Director of Communications Hope Hicks, though their relationship ended by December 2018.

He is a member of the Church of Jesus Christ of Latter-day Saints. He was raised a member of the church and served a full-time, 24-month mission. He became less active in his church around the time of his second divorce.

Domestic abuse allegations
In late November 2017, a girlfriend of Porter's alerted her friend, White House Counsel Don McGahn, regarding Porter's "anger problems". Porter's ex-wife Willoughby had sought and received a three-day emergency protective order against him in June 2010. Photographs of Holderness with a black eye and her detailed accounts of Porter's alleged abuse were also made public.   Despite their testimonies and evidence presented, Porter denied his ex-wives' allegations and resigned from his staff secretary post after they became public. Willoughby stated "I don't want to be married to him. I would not recommend anyone to date him or marry him. But I definitely want him in the White House and the position he is in. I think his integrity and ability to do his job is impeccable."

Porter resigned from the position of White House Staff Secretary on February 7, 2018, following public allegations of spousal abuse from his two ex-wives. The allegations were supported by photographs of a black eye (which Porter claimed he took) and a restraining order. Porter has said the allegations are false and are part of a "coordinated smear campaign". The Washington Post reported that White House counsel Donald McGahn had known since January 2017 about the allegations Porter's ex-wives made to the FBI, and that Chief of Staff John F. Kelly had known about the allegations since October 2017, still promoting Porter after. Post reporter Aaron Blake wrote that this development made the allegations a "full-blown scandal".

Asked by reporters two days after Porter's resignation, President Donald Trump commented, "He said very strongly yesterday that he's innocent so you have to talk to him about that, but we absolutely wish him well, he did a very good job when he was at the White House." In mid-February 2018, it was reported that Senator Hatch had sent letters to Porter's former wives, apologizing for initially defending Porter in response to their accusations against him.

Kelly told reporters on March 2, 2018, that he sought Porter's resignation immediately after learning of the accusations on February 6 and regretted his handling of Porter's departure; he also said that contrary to earlier White House statements, Porter's background check had been completed by the FBI, as had been disputed publicly by bureau director, Christopher Wray.

References

External links

Living people
Trump administration personnel
Massachusetts Republicans
Latter Day Saints from Massachusetts
Alumni of New College, Oxford
Harvard Law School alumni
People from Belmont, Massachusetts
People from Washington, D.C.
People from Boston
American Rhodes Scholars
21st-century Mormon missionaries
American Mormon missionaries in England
White House Staff Secretaries
1977 births
Harvard College alumni